There are five amphoe (districts) named Chaloem Phra Kiat in Thailand. All were created in 1996 in celebration of the 50th anniversary of King Bhumibol Adulyadej's accession to the throne, becoming effective on December 5, the birthday of the King. Chaloem Phra Kiat is an honorific way of addressing a member of the royal family.

Chaloem Phra Kiat, Buriram province
Chaloem Phra Kiat, Nakhon Ratchasima province
Chaloem Phra Kiat, Nakhon Si Thammarat province
Chaloem Phra Kiat, Nan province
Chaloem Phra Kiat, Saraburi province

Chaloem Phra Kiat